Armando Vajushi (born 3 December 1991) is an Albanian professional footballer who last played as an attacking midfielder or a winger for Liga I club Petrolul Ploiești.

Vajushi made his senior debut for Vllaznia Shkodër in 2009, aged 17. He moved abroad to Bulgarian club Litex Lovech in January 2012, and three years later earned a transfer to Chievo in Italy. He did not make any appearances for the Gialloblu and spent the following seasons with stints in the Serie B, before returning to Albania with Teuta Durrës in 2019. In 2020, Vajushi joined Petrolul Ploiești in Romania.

Internationally, he registered his full debut for the Albania national team in a 0–4 friendly loss to Argentina in June 2011.

Club career

Vllaznia Shkodër
Vajushi is a product of the academies of his hometown club Vllaznia Shkodër, where he was part for 3 years before becoming professional.

Vajushi made his professional debut for Vllaznia Shkodër in the Europa League against Rapid Vienna on 16 July 2009, coming on as a 77th-minute substitute for Fetim Kasapi in the 5–0 loss. He made his league debut in the opening game on 23 August 2009 against Besa Kavajë, replacing Ansi Nika in the 72nd minute in the 2–0 loss.

In UEFA.com's season review of 2010–11, Vajushi was the 'One To Watch' and described as "one of the hottest prospects in Albania" after a successful campaign in which he made 32 league appearances for Vllaznia Shkodër and earned his first full international cap with Albania.

He went on trial at German Bundesliga side 1. FC Köln before the start of the 2011–12 season but Köln did not follow up their interest in the player as they deemed his €300,000 price tag too expensive. He even scored twice in a 7-0 friendly against Vorgebirgsauswahl and was described by manager Stale Solbakken as being "very fast, even mentally" and that he was convinced in his ability.

Litex Lovech

On 3 January 2012, Vajushi joined Bulgarian A PFG title holders Litex Lovech on a three and a half-year contract, for a fee of €100,000. He made his debut in a 3–0 home win over Vidima-Rakovski on 3 March, coming on as a substitute for Galin Ivanov.

On 12 May, Vajushi scored his first goal, netted the fourth for Litex's 5–0 victory over Kaliakra Kavarna. On 2 March 2013, he scored two goals in the 0–2 away win over CSKA Sofia and a few days later he voted by journalists as the player of the Bulgarian A Football Group 16th week. In the 2012–13 season, Vajushi played in all 30 league games for Litex and finished the season with 9 goals. On 10 August 2013, Vajushi scored Litex's 1000th A PFG goal in a 5–1 away win over Pirin Gotse Delchev.

Vajushi finished the first part of the 2013–2014 season with a total of 24 appearances (including 2 in the Bulgarian Cup), 9 goals (were 8 goals scored in the league, positioning in 10th place in the League's rank of Top scorers and 1 goal scored in Bulgarian Cup), also a total of 9 assists, positioning in second place behind Zdravko Lazarov on League's rank of Top assists. Litex were placed as runners-up in the League table and gained entry in the Championship Group, who played with a total of seven teams. Vajushi finished the 2013–2014 season scoring in total 11 goals (including 1 in the Bulgarian Cup) in 33 appearances and Litex ranked 3rd in the league table, gaining entry to play in the UEFA Europa League for the next season.

Italy
On 1 February 2015 Vajushi signed for Italian Serie A team Chievo Verona becoming the second Albanian player to transfer in Italy during the Winter transfers window, after Andi Lila who moved to Parma.

On 20 July 2016, Vajushi moved to Pro Vercelli.

Teuta Durrës
On 4 February 2019, Vajushi joined Teuta Durrës on a contract for the rest of the season.

Petrolul Ploiești
On 22 January 2020, he signed for Romanian club Petrolul Ploiești.

International career
He made his international debut with the Albania national under-19 football team in the UEFA European Under-19 Championship (qualifying round) 2010 on 13 November 2009 in the opening match against Italy, finished in the hard 5–0 loss in where Vajushi came in as a substitute in the second-half 59th minute in place of Edon Hasani.

Vajushi was called up for the Albania national under-21 football team's closing match of the 2011 UEFA European Under-21 Championship qualification - Group 10 against Azerbaijan on 4 September 2010. He made it his debut for Albania U21 against Azerbaijan by coming on as a substitute in the 63rd minute in place of Ardit Shehaj and the match finished in the 3–2 loss. For the 2013 UEFA European Under-21 Championship qualification Vajushi played in 7 out 8 matches, all as a starter where he got substituted off in only 1 match, as Albania U21 came last trailing behind Russia, Portugal, Poland and Moldova, with 1 win and 2 draws, 11 goals scored and 18 conceded.

He made his international debut for Albania national football team on 20 June 2011 in a friendly match against Argentina. Vajushi scored his first goal for Albania on 8 June 2014, playing as a starter against San Marino and scoring the second goal in the 32nd minute, also gave an assist for the opening goal scored by Mërgim Mavraj in the 28th minute.

Career statistics

Club

International

Scores and results list Albania's goal tally first, score column indicates score after each Vajushi goal.

Honours
Individual
Albanian Footballer of the Year: 2011
Albanian Superliga Talent of the Season: 2010–11
Albanian Superliga Player of the Month: February 2011

References

External links

1991 births
Living people
Footballers from Shkodër
Albanian footballers
Association football midfielders
Association football forwards
Kategoria Superiore players
First Professional Football League (Bulgaria) players
Serie B players
Liga II players
KF Vllaznia Shkodër players
PFC Litex Lovech players
A.C. ChievoVerona players
U.S. Livorno 1915 players
F.C. Pro Vercelli 1892 players
U.S. Avellino 1912 players
KF Teuta Durrës players
FC Petrolul Ploiești players
Albania international footballers
Albania under-21 international footballers
Albania youth international footballers
Albanian expatriate footballers
Albanian expatriate sportspeople in Bulgaria
Expatriate footballers in Bulgaria
Albanian expatriate sportspeople in Italy
Expatriate footballers in Italy
Albanian expatriate sportspeople in Romania
Expatriate footballers in Romania